The molecular formula C16H34 (molar mass: 226.44 g/mol, exact mass: 226.2661 u) may refer to:

 Hexadecane (cetane)
 Isocetane

Molecular formulas